The Holman Climax Male Voice Choir is a Cornish choir which was formed in 1940 and is based in Camborne, Cornwall. It was originally known as the Climax Male Voice Choir, but added the name Holman to its title during the late 1960s after the two companies of Holman's and Climax merged.

The Holman Climax Male Voice Choir was formed in 1940 by Edgar S. Kessell MBE (1910–1981), the first conductor of the choir, who guided it from its formation until his retirement due to ill health in 1973. Kessell also formed the Treverva Male Voice Choir (in 1936) and Mabe Ladies Choir (in 1940). He was awarded the MBE for his services to Cornish choral music in the New Year's Honours List 1975, and a local musical honour, the Lady Trefusis Medal, in 1976.

The choir was taken over by George Smith, who conducted the Choir for 18 years. Upon his retirement for health reasons the Choir was successfully conducted by Roger Wills until his retirement in 2008. The current Musical Director is Angela Renshaw, well known throughout Cornwall for her boys' choir and her involvement in the promoting of choral music in schools.

The Choir, well known for its initiatives over the years, has produced a DVD, making it the first choir to do so in Cornwall.

References

External links 
 Choir homepage

Cornish music
1940 establishments in the United Kingdom
British choirs
Musical groups established in 1940
Organisations based in Cornwall
Camborne